Nigerian Afrobeats singer CKay has released one studio album, three EPs, eleven singles, and one promotional single. CKay started his music career with Loopy Music, as a record producer. Following the merger between Loopy Music and Chocolate City, he automatically joined Chocolate City roaster. His production credits include M.I Abaga's "Your Father", Koker's "Give Them", Yung6ix's "Everything Gucci", Dotman's "Tonight", and Bisola's "Controlla". He is currently signed to Warner Music Africa, and Atlantic Records.

On 30 August 2019, he released his second ep, CKay the First, through Chocolate City. The project helped bring CKay to popularity and earned him his first chart entry on Billboard 200, Canadian Albums Chart, and the Dutch Album Top 100. The EP was a sleeper hit that spawned the hit track "Love Nwantiti", which became the second Nigerian song to chart on the Billboard Hot 100. In 2021, he became the first African artist to hit 20 million Spotify listeners, and the second African artist in 2022 to reach 1.2 billion streams.

Albums

Extended plays

Singles

Promotional singles

References 

Discographies of Nigerian artists